Friedrich "Fritz" Halmen, also written as Frederic Halmen, (2 April 1912 - 11 October 2002) was a Romanian male handball player. He was a member of the Romania men's national handball team. He was a part of the  team at the 1936 Summer Olympics, playing 3 matches. On club level he played for Hermannstädter Turnverein in Romania.

References

1912 births
2002 deaths
Romanian male handball players
Field handball players at the 1936 Summer Olympics
Olympic handball players of Romania
People from Sibiu County